Het Schip (The Ship) is a building complex in the Spaarndammerbuurt neighbourhood of Amsterdam, Netherlands. The complex in the architectural style of the Amsterdam School was designed by Michel de Klerk in 1919. It originally contained 102 homes (now 82) for the working class, a small meeting hall, a post office, and an elementary school. Since 2001, the former school and post office are used as a museum about the Amsterdam School.

Historical background
In the 19th and early 20th century, Amsterdam faced a major housing shortage, with many working-class people living in cramped quarters with no electricity or running water. Heating was usually provided by burning peat, and poor families often lived in a single room together.

In response to these squalid conditions, the Dutch government passed the National Housing Act (Woningwet) in 1901. This law set up much higher standards for housing and resulted in both the demolition of older, inadequate tenement buildings and the creation of new housing blocks with much better living conditions and prices that made them accessible to Amsterdam's poorer citizens. The new law also set aside financial resources for the development of low-income housing. One of the affordable housing developments created in the wake of the passage of the National Housing Act was the Spaarndammerbuurt, where Het Schip and several other Amsterdam School social housing projects are located.

Much of the new low-income housing was financed by cooperative housing associations run by groups such as workers' collectives, socialist organizations, religious groups. One such group was Eigen Haard, or "our own hearth," a socialist group that commissioned Michel de Klerk to design and build three blocks of proletarian housing, including Het Schip.

Amenities
The apartments of Het Schip were a radical departure from the poor living conditions of many of Amsterdam's working-class people in the 20th century. Relatively spacious, they include several separate rooms as opposed to the one-room dwellings still common at the time. They also included flush toilets and had ample natural light and ventilation from windows. Ground-floor apartments also had gardens.

The building also includes a post office, which the poor had previously had little access to. The post office contained a telephone box from which families could make calls.

Gallery

Exterior and collection

Post office

Museum housing

References

External links

 Het Schip, museum website
 "The Ship" of Michel de Klerk on the website of Roger Shepherd (archived)

Schip, Het
Apartment buildings in the Netherlands
Architecture museums in the Netherlands
Brick buildings and structures
Brick Expressionism
Modernist architecture in the Netherlands
Museums in Amsterdam
Residential buildings completed in 1919
Rijksmonuments in Amsterdam